Jan Adamski (born 11 October 1943) is a Polish chess player who won the Polish Chess Championship in 1982. He received the FIDE title of International Master (IM) in 1976.

Chess career 
In 1963, Adamski was fourth in World U-20 Championship in Vrnjačka Banja. In the Polish Chess Championship, Adamski has won gold (1982), five silver (1968, 1969, 1970, 1975, 1985) and two bronze medals (1973, 1974). He twice won the Polish Rapid Chess Championship (1975, 1983). In Polish Team Chess Championship, Adamski nine times won the team event. He was awarded the International Master title in 1976.

Adamski played for Poland in Chess Olympiads:
 In 1968, at reserve board in the 18th Chess Olympiad in Lugano (+5, =3, -4),
 In 1970, at third board in the 19th Chess Olympiad in Siegen (+7, =3, -2),
 In 1974, at reserve board in the 21st Chess Olympiad in Nice (+4, =4, -3),
 In 1978, at fourth board in the 23rd Chess Olympiad in Buenos Aires (+4, =6, -3),
 In 1982, at fourth board in the 25th Chess Olympiad in Lucerne (+1, =2, -1),
 In 1984, at fourth board in the 26th Chess Olympiad in Thessaloniki (+1, =3, -2).

Adamski played for Poland in European Team Chess Championship:
 In 1973, at sixth board in the 5th European Team Chess Championship in Bath (+0, =3, -2).

Adamski is well known chess coach and teacher of many famous chess players. He was a trainer of Woman Grandmaster (WGM) Agnieszka Brustman.

References

External links 
 
 
 

1943 births
Polish chess players
Chess Olympiad competitors
Chess International Masters
Living people